Dirk Drescher (born 28 February 1968) is a German retired football goalkeeper.

References

External links
 

1968 births
Living people
German footballers
Bundesliga players
VfL Bochum players
Association football goalkeepers